Didier Truchot is a French business executive and is the founder and Chairman of the global market research company Ipsos. He founded the company in 1975 and was the CEO and co-president from 1988 to 2021, when he was succeeded by Ben Page as CEO, and became Chairman. With an estimated net-worth of 550 million euros, he currently holds the 118th greatest personal fortune in France.

Career 
Didier Truchot started his career at the French Institute of Public Opinion (IFOP), where he met Jean-Marc Lech, who would later join Truchot as the co-president of Ipsos. Along with Lech, Truchot led the firm from a small startup to become the third largest market research company in the world.

Personal life 
Didier Truchot has five children and two grandchildren. He stated in October 2015 that he was planning to write a memoir of his life experiences.

References

Living people
French company founders
French chief executives
Place of birth missing (living people)
1946 births